The National Teachers Hall of Fame (NTHF) is a non-profit organization that honors exceptional school teachers. It was founded in 1989 by Emporia State University, the ESU Alumni Association, the City of Emporia, Emporia Public Schools, and the Emporia Area Chamber of Commerce. The NTHF has a museum on Emporia State's campus that honors the teachers inducted. It also has a teacher resource center, and a recognition program, which recognizes five of the nation's most outstanding educators each June. The Hall of Fame annually honors five teachers who have demonstrated commitment and dedication to teaching children. The first induction of five teachers was held in June 1992. To date, 130 teachers have been inducted into The National Teachers Hall of Fame representing 37 states and the District of Columbia.

Awards

Hall of Fame inductees will receive the following awards each year:
 A plaque bearing their name, picture, and a brief description for display in their school and the Hall of Fame
 A signet ring and lapel pin presented by Herff Jones, Inc.
 A permanent display in The National Teachers Hall of Fame museum
 A cast bronze Belltower Award sculpted by John Forsythe
 A personalized print of a one-room school classroom from American Fidelity Assurance
 Travel provided by Southwest Airlines, the official airline of The National Teachers Hall of Fame

Inductees
Educators inducted into the Hall of Fame include:

2010s

2019
 Christopher Albrecht
 Dr. David Bosso
 Richard Knoeppel
 Dr. Mary Jo Murray
 Dyane Smokorowski

2018
 Connie Bagley
 Jeffrey Baxter
 Maureen Murphy-Foelkl
 Peggy Jackson
 Bradley Upshaw

2017
 Ashli Skura Dreher
 Jonathan Gillentine
  Matinga Ragatz
 Joseph Ruhl
 Bob Williams

 2016
 Kimberly Bearden
 Debra Hurst
 June Teisan
 Jennifer Williams
 Wade Whitehead

2015
 Susan Rippe
 Richard Ognibene
 Patricia Jordan
 Ben Talley
 Brigitte Tennis

 2014
 Jan Alderson
 Cindy Couchman
 Marguerite Izzo
 Gary Koppelman
 Rebecca Palacios

 2013
 Deborah Cornelison
 Rebecca Gault
 Darryl Johnson
 Martha McLeod
 Beth Vernon

 2012
 Glenn Lid
 Scott Charlesworth-Seiler
 James Brooks
 David Brock
 Deborah Tackmann

 2011
 Walter Patrick Earle
 Debra Howell
 Paul Miller
 James Percoco
 Mark Weaver

 2010
 Linda Evanchyk
 Erlene Nelson
 Warren Phillips
 Alesia Slocumb-Bradford
 Darrell Woods

2000s

 2009
 Kenneth Bingman
 Patrice McCrary
 Leslie Nicholas
 Jerry Parks
 Steve Rapp

 2008
 Ronald Blanchard
 Kathleen Engle
 Penny Ferguson
 David Lazerson
 Suzanne Ransleben

 2007
 Norman Conard
 Edna Rogers
 Geri Rohlff
 John Snyder
 Joseph Underwood

 2006
 Peggy Carlisle
 Pat Graff
 Floyd Holt
 Harlan Kredit
 Linda White

 2005
 Marilyn Barrueta
 Randy Granger
 John Mahoney
 Karen Roark
 Merle Saunders

 2004
 Melanie Hocking
 Barbara Kelley
 Jane Koszoru
 John Sullivan
 George Wolfe

 2003
 Ruth Gaines
 Cynthia Jones
 Kathleen McGrath
 Larry Statler
 Carol Strickland

 2002
 Lisa Crooks
 Janice Gould
 Dana Kelly
 E. Lindquist
 Jane Nelson

 2001
 Mitsuye Conover
 Ronald Foreso
 Emiel Hamberlin
 Ellen Kempler
 James Quinlan

 2000
 Nancy Berry
 Susan Haas
 Debi Barrett-Hayes
 Leslie Revis
 Sandra Worsham

1990s

 1999
 Jaime Escalante
 Dorothy Kittaka
 Debra Peppers
 Ronald Poplau
 Vicki Roscoe

 1998
 George Beyer
 Gerard Brooker
 Ross Burkhardt
 Dale Faughn
 Hector Ibarra

 1997
 Larry Baran
 Robert Bruesch
 Thomas Fallon
 Dorothy Lorentino

 1996
 Tommy Delaney
 Sallie Langseth
 Sarah Pratt (teacher)
 Stephen Sroka
 Gary Swalley

 1995
 Judy Haller
 Michael Kaiser
 Thomas Porton
 Michael Terrell
 Marjorie West

 1994
 Robert Coleman
 Jean Damisch
 Francis Mustapha
 Renee O'Leary
 Richard Ruffalo

 1993
 Leslie Black
 Stewart Bogdanoff
 Ida Dark
 James Jackson
 Christine Lungren-Maddalone

 1992
 Sheryl Abshire
 Anna Alfiero
 Helen Case
 Shirley Naples
 Joseph York

Wall of Fame
The National Teachers Hall of Fame maintains a "Wall of Fame" in their museum which allows individuals, by way of donation to the museum, to honor a teacher with a personalized brick on the wall. Additionally, teachers are presented with a certificate and an online entry in the Wall of Fame database.

National Memorial to Fallen Educators

On June 13, 2013, the NTHF executive director Carol Strickland, along with former ESU President Michael Shonrock, Bill Maness, representing U.S. Sen. Jerry Moran, and former mayor Rob Gilligan, broke ground by the one-room school house located on the Emporia State campus to build a memorial for the educators who have fallen in the "line of duty". The Sandy Hook Elementary School shooting was the main inspiration for the memorial. On June 6, 2014, the granite memorial markers were placed along with granite benches. The official dedication was on June 12, 2014.

On September 21, 2015, United States Senator Jerry Moran of Kansas introduced a bill to the United States Congress to designate the memorial as the National Memorial to Fallen Educators. The bill was signed into law April 30, 2018 and does not provide federal funds.

One in a Million – Educators Who Make a Difference initiative
This is a nationwide campaign sponsored by the NTHF which encourages people to honor a favorite educator or one who has made a difference in their life. For a minimum donation of one dollar, and submit their nomination. In turn, the Hall of Fame will preserve the educator's name and information on a webpage as well as in the National Teachers Hall of Fame Museum. The goal of this campaign is to raise awareness of the Hall of Fame and of the importance of the education profession.

See also
 List of national memorials of the United States

References

External links
 
National Memorial to Fallen Educators

Teacher awards
Teach
Non-profit organizations based in Kansas
1989 establishments in Kansas
Emporia State University
National Memorials of the United States